Chartres Brew (31 December 1815 – 31 May 1870) was a Gold commissioner, Chief Constable and judge in the Colony of British Columbia, later a province of Canada.

Brew's name was conferred on two mountain summits in British Columbia, both named Mount Brew. The other is just east of Likely, British Columbia in the Cariboo district, adjacent to Quesnel Lake.

References
Ormsby, Margaret. "Chartres Brew." In Dictionary of Canadian Biography, vol. IX. Toronto: University of Toronto, 1976, 81-3.

External links 
 Biography at the Dictionary of Canadian Biography Online

1815 births
1870 deaths
Lawyers in British Columbia
Judges in British Columbia
Pre-Confederation British Columbia people
19th-century Canadian civil servants
People from County Clare
Gold commissioners in British Columbia
Canadian police chiefs
British Auxiliary Legion personnel
Royal Irish Constabulary officers
Colony of British Columbia (1866–1871) judges
Irish emigrants to pre-Confederation British Columbia
Members of the Legislative Council of British Columbia
Colony of British Columbia (1858–1866) judges